Nanoq (Inuit for polar bear) is a museum in Jakobstad, Finland, specializing in arctic culture and Greenland in particular.

The museum hosts exhibitions about famous polar expeditions and displays many items, e.g. a replica of the balloon gondola from S.A. Andrée's fateful expedition and material from the John Phipps expedition to Svalbard around 1770, as well as several artifacts related to the Norwegian explorers Fridtjof Nansen and Roald Amundsen.

External links
The Arctic Museum's homepage

Ethnographic museums in Europe
Museums in Ostrobothnia (region)
Jakobstad
Open-air museums in Finland